Edward Stephen Waitkus (September 4, 1919 – September 16, 1972) was a Lithuanian American first baseman in Major League Baseball who had an 11-year career (1941, 1946–1955). He played for the Chicago Cubs and Philadelphia Phillies in the National League and for the Baltimore Orioles of the American League. He was elected to the National League All-Star team twice (1948 and 1949).

Early career, WWII
Waitkus, the son of Lithuanian immigrants, grew up in Boston and attended Cambridge Rindge and Latin School and Boston College. He began his professional career in 1938 playing for the Worumbo Indians, a semi-professional team sponsored by Worumbo Woolen Mill in Lisbon Falls, Maine. As a rookie, he was known as "the natural," which gave the title to the book loosely based on his life. 

Waitkus saw some of the bloodiest fighting of World War II with the U.S. Army in the Philippines, and was awarded four Bronze Stars. During Operation Cartwheel Waitkus saved the life of a badly bleeding fellow soldier, leaving his foxhole during an attack on his position, and finding some safety pins to stop the bleeding.

Upon his return to baseball he quickly became a star for the Chicago Cubs. He also became a popular media figure, as he was well-educated and was fluent in Lithuanian, Polish, German, and French. Following the 1948 season, the Cubs traded Waitkus with Hank Borowy to the Philadelphia Phillies for Monk Dubiel and Dutch Leonard.

Shooting
Just a few years into the start of what seemed a very promising career, Ruth Ann Steinhagen, an obsessed fan, shot Waitkus at Chicago's Edgewater Beach Hotel on June 14, 1949, in one of the earliest recognized cases of criminal stalking.

Steinhagen had become infatuated with him when he was a Cub, but seeing him every day in-season may have kept her obsession in check. Once he was traded to the Phillies, Steinhagen's obsession grew to dangerous proportions. She checked into the hotel using the alias of a former high school classmate of his and left a note at the desk, asking him to come to her hotel room on an urgent matter.

When he arrived in her room, she shot him with a .22 caliber rifle; the bullet entered his lung, barely missing his heart. She immediately called the desk to report the shooting and was found cradling his head in her lap. Waitkus was taken to the Illinois Masonic Hospital, where he nearly died several times on the operating table before the bullet was successfully removed. Steinhagen never stood trial but instead was confined to a mental institution for a few years.

Return to action
After being shot in Chicago, Waitkus did not play again in the 1949 season, in which he compiled a .306 batting average with 27 RBI and 41 runs scored in 54 games played. However Waitkus did return in uniform, although not to action, on August 19, 1949, for "Eddie Waitkus Night" at Shibe Park, at which he was feted by the Phillies and showered with gifts.

Waitkus returned to play in the 1950 season as the leadoff hitter for the Whiz Kids team that won the 1950 National League pennant. Waitkus led the team in scoring with 102 runs. Waitkus made his only post-season appearance in the 1950 World Series. After the 1950 season, Waitkus was named the Associated Press Comeback Player of the Year.

Later life
Prior to the 1954 season, the Baltimore Orioles purchased Waitkus from the Philadelphia Phillies for $40,000. Released by the Orioles in 1955, he returned to the Phillies for the remainder of the season. After the 1955 baseball season was complete, the Phillies released Waitkus.

Waitkus taught at Ted Williams' baseball camp before dying of esophageal cancer at age 53.

The Natural
Author Bernard Malamud may have woven the basic elements of the Waitkus story – including that some called Waitkus "The Natural" because of his natural swing – and other baseball legends (notably that of Joe Jackson) into The Natural. The book was published in 1952 and was made into a Hollywood film starring Robert Redford released in 1984.

However, it is unclear if Malamud was solely inspired by the shooting of Waitkus, or if he also borrowed from the life of Cubs shortstop Billy Jurges, who was shot by his ex-girlfriend in 1932 at the Chicago hotel in which they lived.

References

External links

 Jack Bales,"The Shootings of Billy Jurges and Eddie Waitkus"
 Eddie Waitkus at BaseballBiography.com
 Life And Times Of Eddie Waitkus  
 

1919 births
1972 deaths
American people of Lithuanian descent
American shooting survivors
Baltimore Orioles players
Baseball players from Massachusetts
Chicago Cubs players
Deaths from esophageal cancer
Deaths from cancer in Massachusetts
Major League Baseball first basemen
National League All-Stars
Philadelphia Phillies players
Sportspeople from Cambridge, Massachusetts
Moline Plow Boys players
Tulsa Oilers (baseball) players
Los Angeles Angels (minor league) players
United States Army personnel of World War II